Marie Christine de Pardaillan de Gondrin (17 November 1663 – 1675) was the eldest legitimate child of Françoise de Rochechouart de Mortemart and her husband, the Marquis of Montespan. She died in her teens and never married.

Biography

Marie Christine was born in Paris to Louis Henri de Pardaillan de Gondrin, marquis de Montespan and his wife of nine months Françoise de Rochechouart de Mortemart. She was the older of two children born to the couple and had numerous half brothers and sisters as a result of her mother's affair with Louis XIV of France.

When her father found out about the affair between the King and her mother, Montespan decided to take his children away to his country estate before raising a scandal at court, challenging the king one day at Saint-Germain-en-Laye and decorated his carriage with antlers (like horns, these were traditional symbols of the cuckolded husband).

He was promptly imprisoned in the For-l'Évêque, then exiled to his lands - taking young Marie Christine and the even younger Louis Antoine.

This did not stop his agitation, and he not only came to Paris nearly every year between 1670 and 1686 but also commanded an annual requiem mass to be sung for his wife during her lifetime.

Twelve-year-old Marie Christine died at the Château de Bonnefont, one of her father's castles in Gascony.

Ancestry

References and notes

1663 births
1675 deaths
17th-century French people
French nobility
Marie Christine
Royalty and nobility who died as children